Philip Bickerton Winston (August 12, 1845 – July 1, 1901) was an American Civil War veteran who fought for the Confederate States of America and a businessman who served as the 16th mayor of Minneapolis.

Life and career
Winston was born near Hanover Courthouse, Virginia to William O. Winston and Sarah A. Gregory. At the outbreak of the American Civil War he enlisted in the 5th Virginia Cavalry and was eventually promoted to an aide under General Thomas L. Rosser. After the war ended, Winston pursued a farming career for a number of years before moving to Minneapolis in 1872. He found work with the Northern Pacific Railroad and eventually founded a contracting company with his brother F. G. Winston which helped in railroad construction projects across the Midwest.

In 1888 he was nominated by the Democratic party to run for mayor of Minneapolis but lost the election to Edward C. Babb. In 1890 he ran again and was successful, serving one term from 1891 to 1893. He also served two terms in the Minnesota House of Representatives from 1893 to 1895 and from 1899 to 1901.

Winston died in Chicago, Illinois on July 1, 1901. He is buried in his family's private cemetery in Hanover County, Virginia.

Electoral history
Minneapolis Mayoral Election, 1888
Edward Charles Babb 17,882
Philip Bickerton Winston 14,759		
William J. Dean 1,365		
Baldwin Brown 2		
Hugh Galbraith Harrison 1
Write-Ins and Scattering 1		
Minneapolis Mayoral Election, 1890
Philip Bickerton Winston 17,200
Edwin G. Potter 11,000		
Edwin Phillips 1,251		
Ernest F. Clark 973

References

External links
 

1837 births
1901 deaths
Mayors of Minneapolis
People from Hanover County, Virginia
People of Virginia in the American Civil War
Businesspeople from Minneapolis
Farmers from Virginia
Democratic Party members of the Minnesota House of Representatives
19th-century American businesspeople